The Malevolence of Mando Diao is the first compilation album by Swedish band Mando Diao, containing a collection of B-sides, live cuts, and remixes from the band between the years 2002 and 2007.

Track listing

Disc 1

Disc 2

References

Mando Diao albums
2009 compilation albums